Mike Pride may refer to:

Mike Pride (writer), New Hampshire author and historian
Mike Pride (musician), American musician and composer